Esanai is a village 50 miles (31 km) northeast of Trichy, in far southern India, coming under the Perambalur  taluk in Perambalur district of Tamil Nadu state. It is known mainly for its temple to Ayyappan, which is visited by thousands of people from India and abroad. The main economy of the village has been in farming sugarcane and rice. The village has been among the poorest in the state, and development has been slow to make progress, although modern goods such as cellphones, televisions and motorbikes have become common.

Transport links

The main way to reach this place has been via Trichy (Tiruchirappalli). However, from either Trichy or Lalgudi, buses towards Tirumanur or Thiruvayaru have stopped at Alandur-Mettur. Alternatively, buses have travelled to Pullambadi, from where local buses then went to Aalambadi Mettur, about four kilometers (3 miles) from Esanai.

Trains from Chennai have stopped at Dalmiapuram or Tiruvaiyaru, from where taxis can be taken to Esanai. Trains from Trichy have stopped at Lalgudi, from where taxis or local buses have been available to Esanai.

Sri HariHara Puthra Swamy Temple

This temple of Lord Ayyappan is very famous, and his deity is called "Sri Harihara Puthra Swamy" by the populace. Also, there is a Lord Kamatchi Amman deity in this temple. People visit this holy people to pay their rituals and give offerings. The following festivals and functions are being celebrated with gaiety and grandeur with Vedic importance.

1. Chithra Poornima and Laksha Archana: This is done during the full moon day in the month of "Chithirai". The celebration will start with Ganapathy homam, Vigneswara pooja with the chanting of Ekadasa Rudhra Japam. The figure will be adorned with new vastrams and Pushpa Alankaram besides Pushpa Koodaram in the main mandapam. Eka dina Laksha Archana is being done during this celebration.

2. Dhanur masa - Tirupakshi Pooja: This is done during the month of "Margazhi" (15 December – 15 January) of every year. Abishekam, Archana and Aradhana is typically performed on all these days.

3. Makara Sankaranthi: On this auspious day, the deity is being offered with sweet pongal along with the Abishekam, Archana and Aradhana. Thiruvilakku Alankaram in the temple is typically done on that evening.

Gallery

External links

https://web.archive.org/web/20070821235527/http://tnmaps.tn.nic.in/vill.php?dcode=17&centcode=0003&tlkname=Sendurai

Cities and towns in Perambalur district
Hindu temples in Perambalur district